In addition to the Isle of Man itself, the Isle of Man Government administers three small neighbouring islands: the Calf of Man, St Patrick's Isle and St Michael's Isle. There are four places with official status as towns, and four villages, as well as many other smaller settlements. Traditionally the Island is divided into six sheadings, then further into seventeen parishes.

Manx language names are given in italics.

Towns
The official towns of the Isle of Man are:
 Castletown
 Douglas – capital and largest settlement
 Peel
 Ramsey

Villages
The official villages of the Isle of Man, with village commissioners, are:

 Laxey – no longer has village commissioners; is now merely an electoral ward of the parish district of Garff
 Onchan – second largest settlement
 Port St Mary
 Port Erin

Other settlements
Other notable settlements, with no official status, are:

 Andreas
 Baldrine
 Ballabeg (Rushen)
 Ballabeg (Lonan)‡
 Ballasalla
 Ballaugh
 Barregarrow‡
 Braaid‡
 Bradda
 Bride
 Colby
 Cregneash‡
 Crosby
 Dalby
 Derbyhaven‡
 Foxdale
 Glen Auldyn
 Glen Maye
 Glen Vine
 Injebreck‡
 Jurby
 Kirk Michael
 Newtown
 Niarbyl‡
 Port Soderick‡
 Ronague‡
 St Mark's
 St John's
 Strang
 Sulby
 Union Mills
 Port e Vullen‡

Those marked ‡ (at least) are not large enough to be notable as settlements, but some of them may be notable as tourist destinations.

Sheadings
The sheadings of the Isle of Man are:

 Ayre
 Garff
 Glenfaba
 Michael 
 Middle
 Rushen

Historic parishes
The historic parishes currently included in each sheading of the Isle of Man are:

 Ayre
Andreas
Bride
Lezayre
 Garff
Lonan: historical parish, now merged into the parish district of Garff
Maughold: historical parish, now merged into the parish district of Garff
Onchan
 Glenfaba
German
Patrick
 Michael
Ballaugh
Jurby
Michael
 Middle
Braddan
Marown
Santon
 Rushen
Arbory: now merged into the parish district of Arbory and Rushen
Rushen (historically "Kirk Christ Rushen"): now merged into the parish district of Arbory and Rushen
Malew

Historically, each parish was divided into between 5 and 16 treens, each consisting of four quarterlands.

Coastal features
Laxey Bay
Ramsey Bay
Douglas Bay

Other geographical features
 Port-Ny-Ding, a small bay immediately north-west of Bradda West
 Snaefell, the only mountain of the Isle of Man

See also
Registered Buildings of the Isle of Man
 Local government in the Isle of Man
 Ballajura, Western Australia, a suburb in Australia named after but mis-transcribed from Ballajora, a farm at Maughold, Isle of Man.

References

 

 
 
 

Man
Places